The 1997 New Zealand rugby union tour of Europe was a series of matches played in November–December 1997 in Europe by New Zealand national rugby union team.

Results 

Scores and results list New Zealand's points tally first.

References 
 

1997 rugby union tours
tour
1997
1997–98 in Irish rugby union
tour
tour
1997
1997
1997
1997–98 in European rugby union
1997–98 in British rugby union